Vincent Wang, better known by his in-game name Biofrost, is a Canadian League of Legends player who is currently the support for LCS team Dignitas.

Career 
Wang's gaming career began in the NA Challenger Series, playing for teams such as Team Frostbite, Vortex and Dream Team. Following the departure of YellOwStaR after the 2016 NA LCS Spring Split, Wang tried out for Team SoloMid's vacant support position. He would join TSM on their Korean bootcamp, eventually being chosen as their starting support for the 2016 Summer NA LCS Split. Despite his rookie status, TSM finished the split in first place with a 17–1 record, dropping a single match to Phoenix1. In the playoffs, TSM would go on to defeat CLG 3–0 and Cloud9 3–1. Additionally, Wang received the award for Rookie of the Split.

After such a dominant Summer Split, expectations for Wang and TSM were high for the 2016 League of Legends World Championship. The team was placed in Group D, alongside Samsung Galaxy, Royal Never Give Up, and Splyce. However, the team was unable to advance past the group stage, finishing in third with a record of 3–3.

In 2017, Wang continued to play for TSM, finishing first in the regular season and playoffs of both the Spring and Summer Splits. He also attended the 2017 Mid-Season Invitational and 2017 League of Legends World Championship, failing to advance past the group stages of both tournaments. Following the disappointing showing at Worlds 2017, TSM decided to rework its League of Legends roster, dropping Wang in favor of European import, mithy. TSM then sold Wang's contract to Counter Logic Gaming, whom Wang would play for in 2018. In the 2018 NA LCS Spring Split, Wang and CLG would finish in 7th place, narrowly missing the playoffs.

Wang announced he would retire from professional League of Legends for the 2021 Spring season.

Tournament results

Personal life 
Wang came out as gay on May 7, 2022.

References 

Sportspeople from Beijing
Chinese emigrants to Canada
Team SoloMid players
Living people
League of Legends support players
Canadian expatriates in the United States
Twitch (service) streamers
Counter Logic Gaming players
1996 births
Gay sportsmen
LGBT esports players
Canadian esports players
Canadian gay men
21st-century Canadian LGBT people
Canadian LGBT sportspeople